Sub-Division 3, Border Patrol Police Aerial Reinforcement Unit also known as  Special Operation Unit Naresuan 261 ,  Naresuan 261 is a tier 1 special operations unit of The Border Patrol Police, Royal Thai Police (RTP).

History
Special Operations Unit "Naresuan 261" was set up in 1983, Buddhist year 2526, by a Thai cabinet resolution. The resolution, dated 1 February 2526 (1983), was a major policy decision designed to provide a force for counter-terrorism efforts. It was named in honor of King Naresuan the Great.

The Royal Thai Police were given orders to set up training for a special division to accomplish these goals. The unit was founded in 1984, Buddhist year 2527, and placed under the control and responsibility of the Thai Border Patrol Police Police Aerial Reinforcement Unit (PARU).

In late 1986, a royal decree, proclamation number 14, reorganized the Royal Thai Police and Naraesuan 261 was assigned as company 4 under the Border Patrol Police's Aerial Reinforcement Unit.

In 2005, a royal decree, proclamation raised company 4 to the level of Sub-Division 3, Border Patrol Police Aerial Reinforcement Unit.

Naresuan 261 has responsibility for counter-terrorism and resulting criminal cases. The company also plays an important role as executive protection for the king, the queen, and other members of the royal family when they travel. They also train female operatives as executive escorts for Princess Siridhorn when she visits Border Patrol Police schools around Thailand. The company acts as escorts for foreign dignitaries and heads of state visiting Thailand.

Organization Management
Naresuan 261 consists of a 3 special operation companies,  Rescue Company, explosive ordnance disposal (EOD) company and one security company

Training
Initial training was performed by members of the Royal Thai Police Department. Teams are divided up into units of five persons following the model set by Germany's GSG-9. Teams are trained in military tactics, sniping, waterborne operations, martial arts, and operation of a variety of vehicles.

After initial training, groups pass on their experiences to other members of the company. The company will also assign members to train in foreign countries and bring the knowledge back to Thailand to further help train the company. Standard training is broken up into five parts:

1. International counter-terrorism training consisting of 24 weeks of training for new police privates.

2. International counter-terrorism training consisting of six weeks of training for police on active duty as well as one week of anti-terrorism planning.

3. Explosive ordnance disposal (EOD) training consisting of 12 weeks of training.

4. Sniper/counter-sniper training consisting of four weeks of training for those assigned to sniper positions.

5. Electronics proficiency training consisting of 12 weeks of training for those assigned to the duty of electronics proficiency officer.

The company takes part in cross-training with special operations divisions of the Royal Thai military as well as training with their counterparts in various units in Australia, South Africa, Germany, and the United States.

Operations
The company has been involved in a number of high-profile criminal cases, including:

1. Burmese student takeover of the Myanmar Embassy in Bangkok on 1–2 October 1999 (2542).

2. Takeover of the Ratchaburi Hospital in Ratchaburi Province on 24–25 January 2000 (2543).

3. Release of hostages from the Karen-Burmese rebellion at Samut Sakhon Province Prison on 22–23 November 2000 (2543).

These three major successful operations were all under the control of Naresuan 261. In all these situations, the mission was accomplished and the hostages were rescued.

See also
Border Patrol Police
List of Special Response Units
List of special forces units

References

External links

Official Royal Thai Police website 
English Information on the Royal Thai Police
 Unofficial Naresuan 261 site 
English Information on the Royal Thai Police

Law enforcement in Thailand
Organizations established in 1983
1983 establishments in Thailand
Special forces of Thailand 
Hostage rescue units
Royal Thai Police